The 1998–99 season was Heart of Midlothian F.C.s 16th consecutive season in the top level of Scottish football, the new Scottish Premier League, formed by the clubs from the previous season's Scottish Premier Division. Hearts also competed in the UEFA Cup Winners' Cup, Scottish Cup and League Cup.

Fixtures

Friendlies

Cup winners' cup

League Cup

Scottish Cup

Scottish Premier League

League table

Stats

Scorers

See also
List of Heart of Midlothian F.C. seasons

References

External links 
 Official Club website
 Complete Statistical Record

Heart of Midlothian F.C. seasons
Heart of Midlothian